Blaise Tohou (born 17 February 1997) is a Chadian footballer who plays for FC Lyon and the Chad national team.

Early career
In 2006 Tohou joined Stade Amplepuisien. He remained at the club until 2012 when he joined the academy of Olympique Lyonnais of Ligue 1. He stayed with the club for four seasons before leaving due to injury. During his final two seasons at Lyonnais he worked his way into the second team and made three league appearances in the Championnat National 2. After departing from Olympique Lyonnais, Tohou joined FC Lyon from 2016 to 2017.

College career
Tohou played college soccer in the United States for the UConn Huskies from 2017 to 2019. In total he made 51 appearances for the team, scoring two goals.

International career
Tohou was first invited to the Chad squad in August 2015 for 2016 African Nations Championship qualification. He eventually made his senior international debut on 10 October 2020 in a friendly loss to Niger.

Career statistics

International

References

External links
National Football Teams profile

1997 births
Living people
Chadian footballers
Chadian expatriate footballers
Chad international footballers
Association football midfielders